The National Newspaper Publishers Association (NNPA), formerly the National Negro Publishers Association, is an association of African American newspaper publishers from across the United States.

History 
The NNPA was founded in 1940 when John H. Sengstacke, of the Chicago Defender, organized a meeting with other African American publishers intended for "harmonizing our energies in a common purpose for the benefit of Negro journalism". In 1956, the trade association was renamed with the current moniker.

"In 2000, the NNPA launched NNPA Media Services — a print and web advertising placement and press release distribution service."
Since 2014, Dr. Benjamin Chavis has been the president and CEO of the organization.

Black Press USA
In 2001, NNPA created an electronic news service, Black Press USA, which enables newspapers to provide real-time news and information to its national constituency. In 2003, Larry Muhammad reported for NeimanReports that Black Press USA "is a project of the Black Press Institute and handled by XIGroup, a Web development firm co-owned by Joy Bramble, publisher of The Baltimore Times, an NNPA member publication."

Membership
In the early 21st century, the NNPA is composed of more than 200 African American newspapers in the United States and the Virgin Islands. They have a combined readership of 15 million.

References

External links 
 National Newspaper Publishers Association web site
 NNPA history, NNPA website
 The Black Press: Soldiers Without Swords, PBS
 The Black Press: Soldiers Without Swords, California Newsreel
 Black Press History short article on the NNPA website

Newspaper associations
Trade associations based in the United States
African-American press
American journalism organizations